The Ganja Volunteer Battalion was a battalion of volunteers made up of active and reserve Azerbaijani military personnel sent to the Nagorno-Karabakh region as part of the Armed Forces of Azerbaijan force fighting in the first Nagorno-Karabakh War. The battalion is best known for liberation of Askeran province and elimination of Armenian Arabo Unit on June 29, 1992, in Ağdərə.

See also
 Military history of Azerbaijan

References

Military units and formations of Azerbaijan in the First Nagorno-Karabakh War
Battalions of Azerbaijan
Military units and formations established in 1992